Jongsanan Fairtex is a Thai Muay Thai fighter.

Biography and career
Jongsanan was born July 24, 1974, in Chaiyaphum Province. He grew up in a poor farming family, he was introduced to Muay Thai by his grandfather with whom he would watch fights on the local television. He wasn't doing well in school and told his parents he wanted to be a fighter. He started fighting in the region from the age of 11.

At 16 Jongsanan managed to join the Fairtex Gym in Bangkok through his uncle's connections. The first five months were rough as he didn't receive any training and kept doing various chores until the gym needed him as a last minute replacement. After the win on short notice Jongsanan gained respect of the trainers, most notably of Monlit Sitphodaeng.

In 1991 Jongsanan was matched with Dokmaipa Por Pongsawang, at the time Jongsanan was receiving only 60,000 baht a fight while Dokmaipa received 200,000 baht. Jongsanan's promoter, Mr. Philip Wong, wanted this fight to be his rise to stardom, he trained harder than ever and managed to win by decision at Lumpinee Stadium on July 7.

His rise to stardom at Lumpinee Stadium was blazingly fast, becoming champion in less than 20 fights. He was known for his power, clinch and sweeps.

Jongsanan's most intense rivalry was against Sakmongkol Sithchuchok, they had 7 fights. Their fifth fight became known as the "Elbow Fight" and is considered as one of the most brutal in Muay Thai history.

In 1998 Jongsanan moved to the United States to become a trainer at the Fairtex gym in San Francisco. He kept fighting in the United States in kickboxing, boxing and Muay Thai rules until 2005.

Titles and accomplishments

Muay Thai
Lumpinee Stadium
 1992 Lumpinee Stadium (126 lbs) champion
 1993 Lumpinee Stadium fight of the year (vs Sakmongkol Sithchuchok)
 1994 Lumpinee Stadium (135 lbs) champion
World Muay Thai Council
 1992 W.M.T.C world champion
International Karate Kickboxing Council
 2004 IKKC world (147 lbs) champion
International Sport Karate Association
 2000 ISKA Muay Thai intercontinental (147 lbs) champion
 2005 ISKA Oriental rules world super welterweight champion
International Kickboxing Federation
 1998 IKF Muay Thai North American welterweight champion

Amateur boxing
 Thailand's “Kings Cup” silver medalist
 Thailand's “Army Cup” silver medalist

Fight record

|-  bgcolor="#cfc"
| 2005-08-20 || Win ||align=left| Steve Berkelayko || New York's Best of the Best|| New York, USA || TKO (Corner Stoppage) || 3 || 
|-
! style=background:white colspan=9 |
|-  bgcolor="#cfc"
| 2005-05-28 || Win ||align=left| Imro Main || Bad To The Bone || Las Vegas, Nevada, USA || TKO (Ref Stop/Punch) || 3 || 1:15 
|-
! style=background:white colspan=9 |
|-  bgcolor="#cfc"
| 2005-02-05 || Win ||align=left| Marco Piqué || Muay Thai World Championships || Las Vegas, Nevada, USA || TKO (Ref Stop/Punch) || 3 || 1:15 
|-
! style=background:white colspan=9 |
|-  bgcolor="#cfc"
| 2004-09-11 || Win ||align=left| Hisayuki Kanazawa || WCK World Championship Muay Thai 15th Anniversary Show || Las Vegas, Nevada, USA || TKO (Knee)  ||3 || 
|-
! style=background:white colspan=9 |
|-  bgcolor="#cfc"
| 2003-10-04 || Win ||align=left| Jason Fenton || New York's Best of the Best|| Sacramento, California, USA || Decision (Unanimous) || 5 || 3:00 
|-
! style=background:white colspan=9 |
|-  bgcolor="#c5d2ea"
| 2003-04-27 || No Contest ||align=left| Ruben Yanez || Ultimate Muay Thai Challenge || Fresno, California, USA || Referee Stoppage  || || 
|-
|-  bgcolor="#cfc"
| 2002-03-23 || Win ||align=left| Daniel Dawson || Master Toddy Show @ Stardust Casino || Las Vegas, NV, USA || Decision || 5 || 3:00
|-  bgcolor="#cfc"
| 2000-11-04 || Win ||align=left| Danny Steele || Strikeforce || San Jose, USA || Decision (Split)  ||5 ||3:00
|-  bgcolor="#cfc"
| 2000-05-13 || Win ||align=left| Morad Sari || ISKA Muay Thai || San Jose, California, USA || Decision (Majority)  ||5 ||3:00 
|-
! style=background:white colspan=9 |
|-  bgcolor="#cfc"
| ? || Win ||align=left| Mark Brackenbury ||  || Las Vegas, Nevada, USA || TKO (Referee Stoppage) || 3 ||
|-  bgcolor="#cfc"
| 1999 || Win ||align=left| Yuan Yubao||  || Hawaii || Decision || 3 || 3:00
|-  bgcolor="#cfc"
| 1998-12-08 || Win ||align=left| Fernando Calleros || IKF || Sacramento, California, USA || Decision (Unanimous)  ||5 ||3:00 
|-
! style=background:white colspan=9 |
|-  bgcolor="#cfc"
| 1998-10-10 || Win ||align=left| Cecil Hagins ||  || United States || KO (Low kicks)  ||3||

|-  style="background:#fbb;"
| 1997-07-13|| Loss ||align=left| Hassan Kassrioui || La Nuit des Titans || Morocco || KO  (High kick)|| 2 ||
|-  style="background:#fbb;"
| 1996-08-03 || Loss ||align=left| Sakmongkol Sithchuchok || Beer Chang Tournament, Lumpinee Stadium || Bangkok, Thailand || KO (Right high kick) || 3 ||
|- style="background:#cfc;"
| 1996-07- || Win ||align=left| Namkabuan Nongkeepahuyuth || Beer Chang Tournament, Lumpinee Stadium || Bangkok, Thailand  || Decision || 5 || 3:00
|- style="background:#cfc;"
| ? || Win ||align=left| Pairot Wor.Wolapon || Lumpinee Stadium || Bangkok, Thailand  || Decision || 5 || 3:00
|-  style="background:#fbb;"
| 1996-01-19 || Loss ||align=left| Sangtiennoi Sor.Rungroj || Lumpinee Stadium || Bangkok, Thailand  || Decision || 5 || 3:00
|-  style="background:#cfc;"
| 1995-09-29 || Win ||align=left| Sangtiennoi Sor.Rungroj || Lumpinee Stadium || Bangkok, Thailand  || Decision || 5 || 3:00
|-  style="background:#c5d2ea;"
| 1995-08-18 || Draw||align=left| Sangtiennoi Sor.Rungroj || Lumpinee Stadium || Bangkok, Thailand  || Decision || 5 || 3:00
|-  style="background:#cfc;"
| 1995- || Win ||align=left| Cherry Sor Wanich ||  || Bangkok, Thailand || Decision || 5 || 3:00
|-  style="background:#cfc;"
| 1995- || Win ||align=left| Cherry Sor Wanich ||  || Bangkok, Thailand || Decision || 5 || 3:00
|-  style="background:#cfc;"
| 1995-04-25 || Win||align=left| Sakmongkol Sithchuchok || Lumpinee Stadium || Bangkok, Thailand || KO (High kick) || 2 ||
|-  style="background:#fbb;"
| 1995-03-28 || Loss ||align=left| Orono Por Muang Ubon || Lumpinee Stadium || Bangkok, Thailand || Decision  || 5 || 3:00
|-
! style=background:white colspan=9 |
|-  style="background:#fbb;"
| 1995-01-09 || Loss ||align=left| Sakmongkol Sithchuchok || Lumpinee Stadium || Bangkok, Thailand || KO (Knee to the head)|| 4 ||
|-  style="background:#cfc" 
| 1994-12-09|| Win ||align=left| Nuathoranee Thongracha || Lumpinee Stadium || Bangkok, Thailand || Decision || 5 || 3:00
|-  style="background:#cfc;"
| 1994-07-|| Win  ||align=left| Chandet Sor Prantalay|| Lumpinee Stadium  || Bangkok, Thailand || Decision || 5 || 3:00
|-
! colspan="8" style="background:white" |
|-  style="background:#cfc;"
| 1994-06-18 || Win||align=left| Robert Kaennorasing || Lumpinee Stadium || Bangkok, Thailand || KO ||  ||
|-  style="background:#cfc;"
| 1994- || Win||align=left| Sakmongkol Sithchuchok || Lumpinee Stadium || Bangkok, Thailand || KO (Punches)|| 1 ||
|- style="background:#cfc;"
| 1993-12-17 || Win||align=left| Panomrunglek Chor.Sawat || Lumpinee Stadium ||  Bangkok, Thailand  || Decision || 5 || 3:00
|-  style="background:#cfc;"
| 1993-10-30 || Win||align=left| Sakmongkol Sithchuchok || Lumpinee Stadium || Bangkok, Thailand || Decision || 5 || 3:00
|-  style="background:#fbb;"
| 1993-10-05 || Loss ||align=left| Sakmongkol Sithchuchok || Lumpinee Stadium || Bangkok, Thailand || Decision || 5 || 3:00

|- style="background:#fbb;"
| 1993-09-07 || Loss ||align=left| Namkabuan Nongkeepahuyuth || Lumpinee Stadium || Bangkok, Thailand  || Decision || 5 || 3:00
|-  style="background:#cfc;"
| 1992-07-11|| Win||align=left| Therdkiat Sitthepitak ||  || Nakhon Sawan province, Thailand || Decision || 5 || 3:00
|-  style="background:#cfc;"
| 1993-05-04 || Win ||align=left| Sakmongkol Sithchuchok || Lumpinee Stadium || Bangkok, Thailand || Decision  || 5 || 3:00
|-  style="background:#cfc;"
| 1993-04-06|| Win ||align=left| Superlek Sorn E-Sarn || Lumpinee Stadium || Bangkok, Thailand || Decision || 5 || 3:00  
|-
! style=background:white colspan=9 |
|-  style="background:#fbb;"
| 1993-01-29|| Loss ||align=left| Therdkiat Sitthepitak || Lumpinee Stadium || Bangkok, Thailand || KO (Right high kick)|| 2 ||
|-  style="background:#cfc;"
| 1992- || Win ||align=left| Petchdam Sor.Bodin || Lumpinee Stadium || Bangkok, Thailand  || KO (Punches)|| 3 ||
|-  style="background:#fbb;"
| 1992-11-06|| Loss ||align=left| Nuathoranee Thongracha || Lumpinee Stadium || Bangkok, Thailand || Decision || 5 || 3:00

|-  style="text-align:center; background:#cfc;"
| 1992-08-|| Win||align=left| Therdkiat Sitthepitak ||  || Australia || Decision || 5 || 3:00

|-  style="background:#cfc;"
| 1992-08-14 || Win ||align=left| Sangtiennoi Sor.Rungroj || Lumpinee Stadium || Bangkok, Thailand  || Decision || 5 || 3:00
|-  style="background:#fbb;"
| 1992-05-29|| Loss ||align=left| Boonlai Sor.Thanikul || Lumpinee Stadium || Bangkok, Thailand || Decision || 5 || 3:00

|-  style="background:#cfc;"
| 1992-04-17|| Win ||align=left| Jaroenthong Kiatbanchong || Lumpinee Stadium || Bangkok, Thailand || Decision || 5 || 3:00  
|-  style="background:#cfc;"
| 1992-|| Win ||align=left|  || || Australia || ||  ||   
|-
! style=background:white colspan=9 |
|-  style="background:#fbb;"
| 1992-03-20|| Loss ||align=left| Nuathoranee Thongracha || Lumpinee Stadium || Bangkok, Thailand || Decision || 5 || 3:00
|-  style="background:#cfc;"
| 1992-02-21|| Win ||align=left| Therdkiat Sitthepitak || Lumpinee Stadium || Bangkok, Thailand || Decision || 5 || 3:00  
|-
! style=background:white colspan=9 |
|- style="background:#fbb;"
| 1992-01-21 || Loss ||align=left| Namkabuan Nongkeepahuyuth || Lumpinee Stadium || Bangkok, Thailand  || Decision || 5 || 3:00
|- style="background:#cfc;"
| 1991-12- || Win||align=left| Cherry Sor Wanich  || Lumpinee Stadium ||  Bangkok, Thailand  || Decision || 5 || 3:00
|- style="background:#fbb;"
| 1991-10-25 || Loss||align=left| Wangchannoi Sor Palangchai  || Lumpinee Stadium ||  Bangkok, Thailand  || Decision || 5 || 3:00
|- style="background:#cfc;"
| 1991-09-24 || Win||align=left| Cherry Sor Wanich  || Lumpinee Stadium ||  Bangkok, Thailand  || Decision || 5 || 3:00
|-  style="background:#c5d2ea;"
| 1991-09-03|| Draw ||align=left| Boonlai Sor.Thanikul || Lumpinee Stadium || Bangkok, Thailand || Decision || 5 || 3:00
|- style="background:#cfc;"
| 1991-07-16 || Win ||align=left| Dokmaipa Por Pongsawang || Lumpinee Stadium ||  Bangkok, Thailand  || Decision || 5 || 3:00
|- style="background:#c5d2ea;"
| 1991-06-04 || Draw ||align=left| Samranthong Kiatbanchong || Lumpinee Stadium ||  Bangkok, Thailand  || Decision || 5 || 3:00
|- style="background:#cfc;"
| 1991-03-15 || Win ||align=left| Panphet Muangsurin || Lumpinee Stadium ||  Bangkok, Thailand  || Decision || 5 || 3:00
|- style="background:#cfc;"
| 1991-02-26 || Win ||align=left|  Makamlek Sitkhunwan || Lumpinee Stadium ||  Bangkok, Thailand  || Decision || 5 || 3:00
|- style="background:#fbb;"
| 1991-01-11 || Loss ||align=left| Boonlertlek Sor Nantana || Lumpinee Stadium ||  Bangkok, Thailand  || Decision || 5 || 3:00 
|-
| colspan=9 | Legend:

See also 

 Fairtex Gym

References

Living people
1974 births
Jongsanan Fairtex
Jongsanan Fairtex

th: